This article lists the confirmed squads for the 2018 Men's Hockey World Cup tournament held in Bhubaneswar, India between 28 November and 16 December 2018. The sixteen national teams were required to register a playing squad of eighteen players and two reserves.

Age, caps and club as of 28 November 2018.

Pool A

Argentina
The squad was announced on 2 November 2018.

Head Coach: Germán Orozco

France
The squad was announced on 13 November 2018.

Head coach:  Jeroen Delmee

New Zealand
The squad was announced on 31 October 2018.

Head coach: Darren Smith

Spain
The squad was announced on 4 November 2018. Miquel Delàs withdrew injured after the game against Argentina and was replaced by Ricardo Sánchez on 1 December.

Head coach:  Frederic Soyez

Pool B

Australia
The squad was announced on 2 November 2018.

Head coach: Colin Batch

China
The squad was announced on 14 November 2018.

Head coach:  Kim Sang-ryul

England
The squad was announced on 13 November 2018. Sam Ward withdrew injured and was replaced by Liam Ansell on 22 November.

Head coach: Danny Kerry

Ireland
The squad was announced on 23 October 2018.

Head coach:  Alexander Cox

Pool C

Belgium
The squad was announced on 4 November 2018. Emmanuel Stockbroekx and John-John Dohmen withdrew injured after the game against India and were replaced by Antoine Kina on 3 December and Augustin Meurmans on 7 December.

Head coach:  Shane McLeod

Canada
The squad was announced on 2 November 2018. Brandon Pereira withdrew injured after the game against South Africa and was replaced by Floris van Son on 4 December.

Head coach: Paul Bundy

India
The squad was announced on 8 November 2018.

Head coach: Harendra Singh

South Africa
The squad was announced on 7 October 2018.

Head coach:  Mark Hopkins

Pool D

Germany
The squad was announced on 4 November 2018. Mark Appel withdrew injured and was replaced by Victor Aly on 9 November. Benedikt Fürk withdrew injured after the game against Malaysia and was replaced by Julius Meyer on 12 December.

Head coach: Stefan Kermas

Malaysia
The squad was announced on 12 November 2018.

Head coach:  Roelant Oltmans

Netherlands
The squad was announced on 26 October 2018. Floris Wortelboer withdrew injured and was replaced by Jorrit Croon on 30 October. Sander de Wijn withdrew injured after the game against Canada and was replaced by Joep de Mol on 12 December.

Head coach:  Maximiliano Caldas

Pakistan
The squad was announced on 14 November 2018. Muhammad Rizwan Sr. withdrew injured after the game against Malaysia and was replaced by Arslan Qadir on 8 December.

Head coach: Tauqeer Dar

References

Squads
Men's Hockey World Cup squads